Mar Thoma II was the second Metropolitan of the Malankara Church from 1670 to 1686.

Introduction

The Malayalam versions of the Canons of the Synod of Diamper use these titles throughout the report except in three places where they use the Latin word archidiaconus.

Consecration
The leaders of the Puthenkoor Malankara Syrian Church selected a nephew (brother's son) of Thoma I as his successor. He was consecrated by Thoma I and the Antiochean patriarchal delegate Gregorios Abdul Jaleel who was the archbishop of Jerusalem. He was the second Thoma who ascended the throne of Malankara Syrian church. When Thoma I died on 25 April 1670 Mar Thoma II, took charge of the Church.

Visits by foreign bishops

Mar Anthraos and three of his brothers from the Middle East arrived at the Mulanthuruthy church in 1678. Later on they moved to various churches and arrived at St. Mary's Orthodox Cathedral, Puthencavu (near Chengannur). On 29 February 1692 while visiting Kallada, he went to the nearby river and was drowned. Two of his brothers went back to Mulanthuruthy and raised families there. Descendants of one of them later established the Malabar Independent Syrian Church.

See also
Malankara Church
Malankara Orthodox Syrian Church
Malabar Independent Syrian Church
Marthoma Syrian Church

References

Further reading
Mathew, N. M. Malankara Marthoma Sabha Charitram (History of the Marthoma Church), Volume 1 (2006), Volume II (2007), Volume III (2008). Pub. E.J.Institute, Thiruvalla.

Oriental Orthodoxy in India
People from Alappuzha district
Indian bishops
Pakalomattam family
1686 deaths
Deaths from lightning strikes
Year of birth unknown
Malankara Orthodox Syrian Church bishops